Parataracticus is a genus of robber flies (insects in the family Asilidae). There are about seven described species in Parataracticus.

Species
These seven species belong to the genus Parataracticus:
 Parataracticus arenicolus Martin, 1968 c g
 Parataracticus cuyamus Wilcox, 1967 i c g
 Parataracticus melanderi Wilcox, 1967 i c g
 Parataracticus niger Martin, 1955 i c g
 Parataracticus rubens (Coquillett, 1904) i c g
 Parataracticus rubidus Cole, 1924 i c g
 Parataracticus wyliei Martin, 1955 i c g b
Data sources: i = ITIS, c = Catalogue of Life, g = GBIF, b = Bugguide.net

References

Further reading

 
 
 

Asilidae genera
Articles created by Qbugbot